Roman Hemby (born August 16, 2002)  is an American football running back for the Maryland Terrapins.

Early life and high school career
Hemby grew up in Edgewood, Maryland and attended The John Carroll School. Hemby was rated a three-star recruit and committed to play college football at Maryland over offers from Appalachian State, Duke, NC State, Vanderbilt, and West Virginia..

College career
Hemby played in four games and rushed 17 times for 71 yards and two touchdowns as a true freshman before redshirting the season. Hemby entered his redshirt freshman as one of the Terrapins' primary running backs alongside Antwain Littleton II. He was named the Big Ten Conference Freshman of the Week after rushing for 114 yards and two touchdowns on seven carries in Maryland's season opener against Buffalo. Hemby repeated as the conference Freshman of the week after rushing for 179 yards and three touchdowns in a 31-24 win over Northwestern. He was also named The Athletic's midseason Freshman All-American.

References

External links
Maryland Terrapins bio

Living people
American football running backs
Maryland Terrapins football players
Players of American football from Maryland
Year of birth missing (living people)